Chaudardes is a commune in the Aisne department in Hauts-de-France in northern France.

Population

Sights
The church, which is a registered historic monument.
The "lavoir", a public place where the women used to wash their clothes and which is also a "monument historique" because of its Blessed Virgin Mary statue whose color is still visible here and there
The chapel, which is behind the lavoir and which can no longer be visited (stones fall)
A statue of the Virgin Mary with the infant Jesus on the village square, near the church
The graveyard
The river Aisne and the ruins of a bridge which was designed to link Chaudardes with Concevreux, a village on the other side of the river (this bridge has been destroyed during the World War I)

See also
Communes of the Aisne department

References

Communes of Aisne
Aisne communes articles needing translation from French Wikipedia